Zone 4 may refer to:

Hardiness zone, a geographically defined zone in which a specific category of plant life is capable of growing
Marcory Zone 4, one of the four zones of Marcory, Abidjan, Ivory Coast
Travelcard Zone 4, of the Transport for London zonal system
Zone 4 (record label), a record label created by producer Polow da Don
Zone 4 of Milan